Hugo Zemp (born 14 May 1937, Basle, Switzerland) is a Swiss-French ethnomusicologist. A prolific recorder of ethnic music and a writer on the subject, he has also shot a number of films about music of various regions, including 1988 film Voix de tête, voix de poitrine and 2002 film An African Brass Band filmed by him in Ivory Coast in 2002. His wide musical expertise includes music notably in Africa, Oceania and Switzerland. He also had particular interest in yodeling and lullabies. His recordings  of lullabies from Solomon Islands were later released by UNESCO as part of their Musical Sources collection. One famous lullaby he recorded, a traditional Baegu lullaby from the Solomon Islands called "Rorogwela" was sung by Afunakwa, a Northern Malaita old woman. The recording was later used, apparently without permission, in Deep Forest's song "Sweet Lullaby".

Prof. Zemp studied musicology and anthropology at the University of Basle graduating in 1961. He also finished a diploma in percussion at the City of Basel Music Academy (Basel's Conservatory school) in 1960. He attended École pratique des hautes études for his doctorate.

He joined French National Centre for Scientific Research (CNRS) becoming a director of research. He taught ethnomusicology at the University of Paris X-Nanterre. In 1982, he became editor the recording series  (Collection du Centre National de la Recherche Scientifique et du Musée de l'Homme on the Le Chant du Monde record label. In tens of productions by Zemp, it included music from Azerbaijan, Bangladesh, Bolivia, Burkina Faso, Chad, Ivory Coast, Romania, Solomon Islands and various countries in Central Africa. There were also a number of recordings of yodeling from Switzerland.

References

External links
 * Hugo Zemp Collection - audio and video archives Audio and video fieldwork and published records French National Centre for Scientific Research

Swiss musicologists
1937 births
Living people